Ehrhardt is Old High German for "Ehre" = honour and "hard" = strong. It may refer to:

 Ehrhardt, South Carolina
 Ehrhardt (automobile), a German automobile
 Marinebrigade Ehrhardt, a Freikorps group after World War I
 Hermann Ehrhardt, the German Freikorps commander after whom the Marinebrigade Ehrhardt was named
 Ehrhardt (surname)
 Ehrhardt (typeface), an old-style serif typeface used in many books